Paris-soir was a French newspaper founded in 1923 and published until 1944 when it was banned for having been a collaborationist newspaper during the war.

Publication history 
The first issue of Paris-soir came out on 4 October 1923. Before the war Paris-soir boasted a circulation of two and a half million – the largest circulation of any newspaper in Europe at that time. A building was specially built for it, by Fernand Leroy et Jacques Cury, in 1934 at 37 rue du Louvre, today Le Figaro's headquarters.

While Paris was occupied by Nazi Germany, it was published under German control, from 22 June 1940 until 17 August 1944. According to Janet Flanner, Paris-soir was the only newspaper to have its printing press, which was new and considered the best in Europe, handed over to the Germans as soon as they entered Paris. After 11 June 1940, during the Nazi occupation, its owner Jean Prouvost, continued the publication in Vichy France: Clermont-Ferrand, Lyon and Marseille.

Upon hearing of the Allied landing, the editorial staff secretly returned to Paris. Before the end of fighting in Paris, on 20 August, journalists in the French Resistance accompanied by French Forces of the Interior occupied Paris-soir building, armed with requisition orders.  The Popular, Le Franc-Tireur, Combat, Le Parisien Libéré, all newspapers close to the resistance, were published using Paris-soir presses. The building of Paris-soir was occupied by Ce Soir, Libération and Front national. Paris-soir management departed, and its leaders were arrested by the FFI. Jean Prouvost went into hiding to avoid arrest. The archives of Paris-soir, held in Paris, were however saved.

A Sunday edition, Paris-soir Dimanche was published from 22 December 1935 until 16 September 1939.

References

Sources
 

1923 establishments in France
1944 disestablishments in France
Defunct newspapers published in France
French Third Republic
Newspapers of the Vichy regime
Newspapers published in Paris
Newspapers established in 1923
Publications disestablished in 1944
Daily newspapers published in France
Banned newspapers